is a city located in Kagoshima Prefecture, Japan.

The modern city of Satsumasendai was established on October 12, 2004, from the merger of the city of Sendai, the towns of Hiwaki, Iriki, Kedōin and Tōgō, and the Koshikijima Islands (which consisted of the villages of Kamikoshiki, Kashima, Sato and Shimokoshiki, all from Satsuma District).

As of May 2017, the city has an estimated population of 96,411 and a population density of 140 persons per km2. The total area is 683.50 km2.

The city has regular Shinkansen services to Kagoshima City and Yatsushiro.

The city is also home to Kagoshima Immaculate Heart University, founded in 1994, which has a small population of foreign students.

A major employer is the Sendai nuclear power station.

Geography

Climate
Satsumasendai has a humid subtropical climate (Köppen climate classification Cfa) with hot summers and mild winters. Precipitation is significant throughout the year, and is heavier in summer, especially the months of June and July.

Demographics
Per Japanese census data, the population of Satsumasendai in 2020 is 92,403 people. Satsumasendai's population has been declining slowly since the census began in 1950, although there was a brief recovery in the 1980s.

Timeline

From 1889 to 2004 
 April 1, 1889 - municipal status enforcement.
 Satsuma District : the villages of Kumanojō, Takae, Nagatoshi, Hirasa, Kami-Tōgō, Shimo-Tōgō, Hiwaki and Iriki.
 Taki District : the villages of Taki and Mizuhiki.
 Minami-Isa District : the villages of Ōmura, Kuroki and Imuta.
 Koshikijima District : the villages of Kami-Koshiki Shimo-Koshiki.
 March 29, 1896 - The districts of Taki, Minami-Isa and Koshikijima were merged into Satsuma District.
 May 20, 1929 - The villages of Kumanojō, Hirasa and Higashi-Mizuhiki were merged to become town of Sendai.
 July 1, 1933 - The village of Nishimizuhiki was renamed to Mizuhiki.
 February 11, 1940 - the town of Sendai was elevated city status to become the city of Sendai.
 November 10, 1940 - The village of Hiwaki was elevated to town status to become the town of Hiwaki.
 October 1, 1948 - The village of Iriki was elevated to town status to become the town of Iriki.
 April 1, 1951 - The village of Mizuhiki was merged into the city of Sendai.
 December 1, 1952 - The village of Kami-Tōgō was elevated to town status to become the town of Tōgō.
 April 1, 1955 - The villages of Ōmura, Kuroki and Imuta were merged to become the town of Kedōin.
 September 30, 1956 - The villages of Takae and Nagatoshi were merged into the city of Sendai.
 April 1, 1957
 Part of Shimo-Tōgō was merged into the town of Tōgō and the village of Taki (respectively).
 Remainder of Shimo-Tōgō was merged into the city of Sendai.
 January 1, 1960 - The village of Taki was elevated to town status to become the town of Taki.
 April 15, 1965 - The town of Taki was merged into city of Sendai.

Satsumasendai (After 2004) 
 October 12, 2004 - the city of Satsumasendai was created from the merger of the city of Sendai, Kagoshima, the towns of Hiwaki, Iriki, Kedōin and Tōgō, and the Koshikijima Islands (which consisted of the villages of Kamikoshiki, Kashima, Sato and Shimokoshiki) (all from Satsuma District).

Festivals 
 Sendai Otsunahiki
 Sendai River Fireworks Festival

Neighboring municipalities 
 Cities : Kagoshima, Kirishima, Izumi, Hioki, Akune, Aira, Ichikikushikino
 Towns : Satsuma

Friendship cities 
  Changshu, P.R. China
  Malu Town, Jiading District, P.R. China

Transport

Railways 
 Kyushu Railway Company
 Kyushu Shinkansen
 Sendai Station
 Kagoshima Main Line
 Sendai Station - Kumanojo Station - Kobanchaya Station
 Hisatsu Orange Railway
 Hisatsu Orange Railway Line
 Nishikata Station - Satsuma-Taki Station - Kusamichi Station - Kamisendai Station - Sendai Station
Former railway line
 Japan National Railway
 Miyanojo Line(1924-1987)
 Sendai Station - Satsuma-Shirahama Station - Kusumoto Station - Yoshinoyama Station - Hiwaki Station - Kamihiwaki Station - Iriki Station

Roads 
Highways
 Minamikyushu Expressway
 Satsumasendai-Miyako IC
National Highway
 Route 3
 Route 267
 Route 328
 Route 504

References

External links

 Satsumasendai City official website 
 Kagoshima Prefectural Visitors Bureau official website 
Sendai Giant Tug-of-war The Asahi Shimbun, 2012/09/23 

Cities in Kagoshima Prefecture
Port settlements in Japan
Populated coastal places in Japan